Península is a mixed-use complex in Tijuana set to open in late 2022 along the Vía Rápida Oriente, the city's main east–west corridor, in the Colonia Chapultepec Alamar neighborhood of La Mesa borough.

There are to be 3,400 parking spaces.

The mall is referred to in the press as both "Península Fashion Mall" and "Plaza Península". Anchors will include Liverpool department stores, Cinépolis multicinemas, Forever 21 and H&M. The restaurant zone is to include a food hall as well as 4,000 sq.m. of patio space. There is to be a 5 star hotel with around 200 rooms, 2 residential towers with a total of 255 apartments, a hospital, gym, aquatic center, co-working facilities, and a 10,000-square-meter wellness zone.

References

Shopping malls in Tijuana
Mixed-use developments in Mexico